Manhartsberg is a low, flat-lying mountain ridge in Lower Austria. It rises to a maximum height of 537 m. It is the southeastern flank of the granite Bohemian massif.

The ridge runs from the Thaya river up to the Wagram mountain range and is partly overlaid with Neogene sediments, primarily clays, sands and gravels of the Vienna Basin formations.  This ridge continues to the northeast into Moravia in the area near Znojmo. The Manhartsberg forms the southeastern edge of the Bohemian massif and constitutes the boundary between two parts of Lower Austria, the upper quarter above the Manhartsberg (Waldviertel) and the lower quarter under the Manhartsberg (Weinviertel). On its west side runs the Kamp river. The western slopes of the Manhartsberg are part of the Kamptal-Schönberg nature park, which has been recognized by UNESCO as an international geopark, the Kamptal Geopark.

Above the town of Maissau, rich veins of amethyst have been found in the Manhartsberg.

Next to one of the highest points on the ridge are the remains of a World War II secret radar installation, whose code name was Zangendorf 4.

References
 Klein, Eugen and Jurasky, Josef (2003) Botanische Wanderung von der March zum Manhartsberg: ein Bilder-Buch Ed. Weinviertel, Gösing/Wagram, in German
 Vogel, Alois (1985) Beobachtungen am Manhartsberg: Gedichte Niederösterreichisches Pressehaus, St. Pölten, Austria, in German
 Rausch, Wilhelm (1990) Durch die Wachau zum Manhartsberg: eine Städteexkursion Österreichisch Arbeitskreis für Stadtgeschichtsforschung, Linz, in German
 Tollmann, Alexander (1977) Geologie von Österreich: Ausserzentralalpiner Anteil Deuticke, Vienna, in German
 Hartmann, Helga and Hartmann, Wilhelm (eds.) (2000) Die Höhlen Niederösterreichs Landesverein für Höhlenkunde in Wien und Niederösterreich, Vienna, OCLC 74914005, (Science supplements to the magazine "Die Höhle") in German

External links

 "Simplified Geological Map of the Weinviertel region"

Landforms of Lower Austria
Ridges of Europe
Bohemian Massif